Sanqaçal (also, Səngəçal and Sangachal) is a settlement and municipality in Baku, Azerbaijan.  It has a population of 4,108.

Economy 
The settlement is home to Sangachal Terminal. The terminal receives oil from the Azeri-Chirag-Guneshli field and natural gas from the Shah Deniz gas field. The oil is exported via the Baku-Tbilisi-Ceyhan pipeline to Turkey's Mediterranean coast and via the Baku-Supsa Pipeline and the Baku-Novorossiysk Pipeline to the Black Sea coast.

References

External links

Port cities in Azerbaijan
Populated places in Baku